Gibraltar competed at the 2009 World Championships in Athletics from 15 to 23 August in Berlin.

The only participant, Dominic Carroll, suffered an injury to his thigh immediately after the start of his 100-metre heat and so did not complete the race.

Team selection

Track and road events

Results

Men
Track and road events

References

External links
Official competition website

Nations at the 2009 World Championships in Athletics
World Championships in Athletics
Gibraltar at the World Championships in Athletics